Meadowbank is a suburb of Auckland city, situated in the North Island of New Zealand. Meadowbank is governed under the local governance of the Auckland Council. It has one shopping centre: Meadowbank Shopping Centre, on the corner of Gerard Way and St John's Road. Purewa Cemetery, one of central Auckland's largest cemeteries, is situated in Meadowbank and can be accessed from St John's Road.

History 

In 1930, an extension of the Remuera electric tramway was opened, servicing Meadowbank.

Demographics

Meadowbank had a population of 5,328 at the 2018 New Zealand census, an increase of 279 people (5.5%) since the 2013 census, and an increase of 633 people (13.5%) since the 2006 census. There were 1,947 households, comprising 2,499 males and 2,829 females, giving a sex ratio of 0.88 males per female, with 1,188 people (22.3%) aged under 15 years, 840 (15.8%) aged 15 to 29, 2,619 (49.2%) aged 30 to 64, and 684 (12.8%) aged 65 or older.

Ethnicities were 76.5% European/Pākehā, 6.2% Māori, 4.8% Pacific peoples, 16.8% Asian, and 4.1% other ethnicities. People may identify with more than one ethnicity.

The percentage of people born overseas was 33.8, compared with 27.1% nationally.

Although some people chose not to answer the census's question about religious affiliation, 44.3% had no religion, 43.2% were Christian, 0.3% had Māori religious beliefs, 1.5% were Hindu, 1.3% were Muslim, 1.6% were Buddhist and 2.7% had other religions.

Of those at least 15 years old, 1,914 (46.2%) people had a bachelor's or higher degree, and 291 (7.0%) people had no formal qualifications. 1,449 people (35.0%) earned over $70,000 compared to 17.2% nationally. The employment status of those at least 15 was that 2,325 (56.2%) people were employed full-time, 600 (14.5%) were part-time, and 138 (3.3%) were unemployed.

Education
St John's College and Trinity Theological College are also located on St John's Road. Local primary schools include Meadowbank School (public) and Mt Carmel School, Meadowbank (state-integrated Catholic). Local secondary schools comprise Selwyn College and Baradene College of the Sacred Heart.

References

External links
Photographs of Meadowbank held in Auckland Libraries' heritage collections.

Suburbs of Auckland
Ōrākei Local Board Area